The Central Queensland NRL bid was a bid launched in March 2009 that tried to represent Central Queensland in an expanded National Rugby League competition. The bid was headquartered in Rockhampton, Queensland.

History and bid region

Rugby League has been played in Central Queensland for over a century and is currently represented in the Queensland Cup by the Central Queensland Capras.
The bid aims to unite a region from Bundaberg in the south to Mackay in the north and west to the state border. Local government areas in the bid region, such as Rockhampton Regional Council and Mackay Regional Council also officially support the bid.

Home ground
Rockhampton's largest stadium is Browne Park and is home to the Capras. The bid has proposed that the club will play out of a new stadium to be built in Rockhampton, called CQ Stadium & Convention Centre.
 
In July 2013 both sides of government promised a detailed design and feasibility study for a new stadium to be conducted and carried out before 2015.

Bid Chairman Geoff Murphy has suggested that while the club will call Rockhampton home, both trials and premiership matches could be taken to other cities in the CQ NRL bid region, such as Mackay, when the team is admitted to the NRL.

Junior Development Program
Since 2011 the bid has run junior development camps and organised matches against Northern Pride junior teams, as well as matches against Marsden State High School in Brisbane and Keebra Park State High School on the Gold Coast.

Community
A public petition was launched in June 2009 and had reached 30,000 signatures by 2011.
The bid also envisions the development of feeder teams in the Queensland Cup, such as Bundaberg, to provide direct pathways for juniors to progress into the NRL team.
In 2011 CQ University partnered with the bid to become a major sponsor and in return will provide academic scholarships for players.

References

External links

2009 establishments in Australia
Rugby clubs established in 2009
Rugby league teams in Queensland
Proposed sports teams
Proposals in Australia
Expansion of the National Rugby League
Sport in Rockhampton
Central Queensland